Gabriel Tarantini is an American actor. He was born in Florida, United States but was raised in Venezuela and Italy. He graduated with a bachelor's degree in Fine Arts from the New York Film Academy in Los Angeles in 2014.  He is best known for playing Andrés in the Venevisión telenovela Somos tú y yo, and played Benjamín González in Silvana sin lana, and Julián on Mi familia perfecta.

References

External links 
 

21st-century American male actors
American male telenovela actors
Hispanic and Latino American male actors
Living people
Year of birth missing (living people)